Costa Rica competed at the 2022 World Games held in Birmingham, United States from 7 to 17 July, 2022. Athletes representing Costa Rica won one gold medal and the country finished in 47th place in the medal table.

Medalists

Competitors
The following is the list of number of competitors in the Games.

Bowling

Costa Rica competed in bowling.

Cue sports

Costa Rica competed in cue sports.

Powerlifting

Costa Rica competed in powerlifting.

Racquetball

Costa Rica won one gold medal in racquetball.

Road speed skating

Costa Rica competed in road speed skating.

Track speed skating

Costa Rica competed in track speed skating.

References

Nations at the 2022 World Games
World Games
World Games